Dolichostyrax moultoni is a species of beetle in the family Cerambycidae. It was described by Per Olof Christopher Aurivillius in 1911. It is known from Borneo and Malaysia.

References

Morimopsini
Beetles described in 1911